The flag of Yaroslavl Oblast, a federal subject of Russia, was adopted 27 February, 2001.  The flag is a field of gold, charged with a bear rampant holding a halberd on its left shoulder.  The ratio of the flag is 2:3.

References
Flags of the World

Flag of Yaroslavl Oblast
Flags of the federal subjects of Russia
Yaroslavl
Yaroslavl